The Kerala Sahitya Akademi Award for Children's Literature (also known as Sree Padmanabhaswamy Award for Children’s Literature) is an award given every year by the Kerala Sahitya Akademi (Kerala Literary Academy) to Malayalam writers for writing children's literature of literary merit. It is one of the twelve categories of the Kerala Sahitya Akademi Award.

Awardees

References

Awards established in 1977
Kerala Sahitya Akademi Awards
Malayalam literary awards
Children's literary awards
Indian children's literature
1977 establishments in Kerala